Car Tape 2 is a 2010 album by the Australian singer-songwriter Lisa Miller. It was the follow-up to 2002's Car Tape. It was released in Australia on 24 April 2010 by Raoul Records and Other Tongues. Care Tape 2 was, like Miller's three previous albums, nominated in the ARIA Awards for "Best Adult Contemporary Album".

References

2010 albums
Lisa Miller (singer-songwriter) albums